Richard Michael Danehe (September 10, 1920 – June 20, 2018) was an American football defensive end and tackle who played two seasons with the Los Angeles Dons of the All-America Football Conference. He played college football at the University of Southern California, having previously attended Hickman High School in Columbia, Missouri. He later worked as a football announcer. Danehe died in June 2018 at the age of 97.

References

1920 births
2018 deaths
People from Columbia, Missouri
Hickman High School alumni
American football tackles
Los Angeles Dons players
Players of American football from Memphis, Tennessee
USC Trojans football players